The Addresses to the German Nation (German: Reden an die deutsche Nation, 1806) is a political literature book by German philosopher Johann Gottlieb Fichte that advocates German nationalism in reaction to the occupation and subjugation of German territories by Napoleon's French Empire. Fichte evoked a sense of German distinctiveness in language, tradition, and literature that composed the common identity of a nation (people).

See also 
 German nationalism
 Nationalism
 Napoleonic Wars
Unification of Germany

References

Bibliography

Further reading
Gregory Moore (ed.), Fichte: Addresses to the German Nation (Cambridge: Cambridge University Press, 2008).

External links

 Reden an die deutsche Nation at gutenberg.de
 Reden an die deutsche Nation at epoche-napoleon.net

__notoc__

1806 non-fiction books
Political science books
Books by Johann Gottlieb Fichte
German nationalism